Avira is a German multinational cybersecurity company.

Avira may also refer to:

 23S rRNA (guanine2535-N1)-methyltransferase, an enzyme
 Avira Rebecca, Indian filmmaker and script writer
 AviraKids, a Russian holding company founded in 2010 specializing in safe gaming and entertainment equipment